Shamima Ali is a Fijian political activist of Indian descent.  As of July 2015, she is the Coordinator of the Fiji Women's Crisis Centre (FWCC), a post she has held for many years. She has also been a member of the Fiji Human Rights Commission (FHRC).

Ali condemned the military coup of 5 December 2006 and has taken a strong stand against human rights abuses alleged to have been committed by the Military-backed interim government.  She has also criticized Shaista Shameem, the Director of the FHRC and a coup-sympathizer, for allegedly ignoring such violations.  When six pro-democracy activists were arrested and allegedly assaulted by the Military in the early hours of 25 December 2006, Shameem told her there was nothing the FHRC could do, according to Ali.  Ali's position in the FHRC had already been further isolated by the resignation of Sevuloni Valenitabua the previous week. 

On 28 December, Ali vowed to continue speaking up, though she admitted that she was somewhat fearful.

On 31 December, the Fiji Sun quoted her as cautioning against believing the claims of Australian fraudster Peter Foster, which was being cited by the Military administration as implicating the deposed government of Prime Minister of involvement in electoral fraud.

Ali spoke out on 4 January 2007 against a report written by Shaista Shameem, condoning and excusing the coup d'état as the removal of an "illegally constituted government". The report was based on Shameem's personal opinions and was neither commissioned nor sanctioned by the FHRC, Ali claimed. "The report by Dr Shameem is not in accordance with Commission procedures and policy and I presume it to be her personal opinion," she said.  "The report carries numerous errors and fabrications," she added. Ali called on Shameem to resign  and declared her intention to consult with her colleagues to explore the possibility of having Shameem dismissed.

Ali claimed that her own intervention had secured the release from military custody of Richard Naidu, a prominent lawyer who was detained on 23 January 2007 for making what the Military called "inciteful" comments on Radio New Zealand. The Military, however, denied that Ali had played a role in the release.

Honours
On 10 December 2009 Ali was awarded Amnesty International Aotearoa New Zealand's inaugural Human Rights Defender award.

In September 2022 she was awarded Vanuatu's 40th anniversary medal for her work in eliminating violence against women and children.

References

External links
 Fijian feminist Shamima Ali

Year of birth missing (living people)
Living people
University of the South Pacific alumni
Fijian civil servants
Fijian Muslims
Fijian women's rights activists